Giovanni Paliaga (11 February 1931 – 29 December 2019) was an Italian swimmer. He competed in the men's 4 × 200 metre freestyle relay at the 1952 Summer Olympics.

References

1931 births
2019 deaths
Italian male swimmers
Olympic swimmers of Italy
Swimmers at the 1952 Summer Olympics
Sportspeople from Trieste
Italian male freestyle swimmers
20th-century Italian people